Ciliberti is a surname. Notable people with the surname include:

Antonio Ciliberti (1935–2017), Italian Roman Catholic archbishop
Barrie Ciliberti (born 1936), American professor and politician
Alessandra Ciliberti, Italian engineer, FIA Formula E World Championship Technical Manager